Posht Tang-e Shah Mirza (also Romanized as Posht Tang-e Shāh Mīrzā; also known as Posht Tang) is a village in Osmanvand Rural District, Firuzabad District, Kermanshah County, Kermanshah Province, Iran. At the 2006 census, its population was 124, in 30 families.

References 

Populated places in Kermanshah County